Mushemi-ye Vosta (also Romanized as Mūshemī-ye Vosţá) is a village in Zilayi Rural District, Margown District, Boyer-Ahmad County, Kohgiluyeh and Boyer-Ahmad Province, Iran. At the 2006 census, its population was 515, in 107 families.

References 

Populated places in Boyer-Ahmad County